Ashwini Bhave (also spelled Ashvini Bhave) is an Indian model and actress known for her work in both Hindi and Marathi-language films and television serials. Born and raised in India, she lives in the San Francisco Bay Area.

Career
Bhave was first noticed on television in a Hindi Sci-Fi serial Antariksh. She later portrayed the lead heroine in Marathi films such as Dhadakebaaz, Ashi Hi Banwa Banwi and Kalat Nakalat opposite top Marathi movie stars like Laxmikant Berde, Ashok Saraf, Sachin and Vikram Gokhale.

Her career spans over 40 films with several critically acclaimed performances in films such as Kalat Nakalat, Ahuti, Ashi Hi Banawa Banvi, Bhairavi, Purush, and the film, Henna by R.K. Productions. Subsequently, she starred in other Hindi movies such as Meera Ka Mohan, Honeymoon, Sainik and Bandhan. Bhave again switched over to television and Marathi movies. In 1993, she performed in the Kannada film Vishnu Vijay directed by Keshu starring South Indian actor Dr.Vishnuvardhan, Akshay Kumar (her co-star in Sainik), Ashutosh Rana and others. In 1997 she acted in V. Manohar's directorial Kannada film Rangenahalliyage Rangada Rangegowda starring  Dr.Ambareesh and Ramesh Aravind.

Bhave also played the lead role in a famous Marathi stage play Lagnachi Bedi (The Handcuffs of Marriage). In 1993, she played the character of a mother to Saif Ali Khan & Aamir Khan (albeit step one in Aamir's case) in the Yash Chopra's movie Parampara. She later acted in a television mega-serial Yugpurush.

Personal life
Bhave graduated with a Bachelor's degree in Philosophy from Ruparel College, Mumbai and a Bachelor's degree in Motion Pictures & Television from the Academy of Art University in San Francisco . 
Ashwini is married to Kishore Bopardikar, an entrepreneur. In 2007, she made a comeback as a producer and lead actress in the Marathi language movie Kadachit, which was shown in both Maharashtra and the US.

Filmography

Films

Web series

See also

List of Indian film actresses

References

External links

Pictures of Ashwini Bhave

Actresses from Mumbai
Indian film actresses
Actresses in Marathi cinema
Living people
Marathi people
Indian stage actresses
Actresses in Marathi television
20th-century Indian actresses
21st-century Indian actresses
1972 births